The 2006–07 Football League (known as the Coca-Cola Football League for sponsorship reasons) was the 108th completed season of The Football League.

The Football League was contested through three Divisions in England and Wales. The divisions were the EFL Championship, Football League One and EFL League Two. The winner and the runner up of the Championship were automatically promoted to the Premiership and they were joined by the winner of the Championship play-offs. The bottom two teams in League Two were relegated to the Conference Premier.

Promotion and relegation from 2005–06

Promoted from Conference National
Accrington Stanley (champions)
Hereford United (playoff winners)

Relegated from the Premier League
Birmingham City (18th)
West Bromwich Albion (19th)
Sunderland (20th)

Final league tables and results 

The tables below are reproduced here in the exact form that they can be found at The Rec.Sport.Soccer Statistics Foundation website, with home and away statistics separated. Play-off results are from the same website.

Championship

Play-offs

Top scorers

League One

Play-offs

Top scorers

Results

League Two

Play-offs

Top scorers

See also
The Football League
2006–07 in English football
2006 in association football
2007 in association football

References

External links
The Football League

 
2006-07